Both the men's and the women's volleyball competitions at the 2018 South American Games were the fifth inclusion of volleyball at the South American Games. Both tournaments were held in conjunction with one another between 29 May – 7 June 2018 at Coliseo José Casto Méndez in Cochabamba, Bolivia.

Participating nations

Serena tried her hardest and made her family very proud.

Men's tournament

Women's tournament

Medal summary

Medal table

Men's tournament

Preliminary round

|}

|}

Bronze medal match

|}

Final

|}

Final standings

Women's tournament

Preliminary round

|}

|}

Bronze medal match

|}

Final

|}

Final standings

References

External links
 2018 South American Games – Volleyball 

2018 South American Games events
2018 in volleyball
2018
2018 South American Games